Sorbus eminens, the round-leaved whitebeam, sometimes classified as Aria eminens when the Aria subgenus of Sorbus is elevated to full genus,  is a species of plant in the family Rosaceae. It is endemic to Great Britain. It is threatened by habitat loss.

Description

As part of the Sorbus aria complex, Sorbus eminens is broadly similar to S. aria. The undersides of the leaves are greyish-white due to the many hairs. The leaves are more or less round, usually with a length 1–1.3 times the width, rarely up to 1.5 times as long as wide; they usually have 9–11 veins on either side. The leaf margins usually have a single series of teeth ("uniserrate") although there can be evidence of a second series ("biserrate"). The fruits have many lenticels, small and large, mainly towards the base.

Distribution and habitat

Sorbus eminens is endemic to parts of south-west England and south Wales. It is considered to be native to calciferous woodland in north Somerset, west Gloucestershire, Herefordshire and Monmouthshire. It has also been recorded in Sutton Park, Birmingham, well outside its expected range, where it is assumed to have been planted originally.

Evolution
S. eminens is a tetraploid, resulting from hybridisation between Sorbus aria and Sorbus porrigentiformis

References

Sources

eminens
Endemic flora of the United Kingdom
Vulnerable plants
Plants described in 1957
Taxonomy articles created by Polbot